Hamada Nampiandraza (born 8 July 1984) is a Malagasy association football referee.

He was one of the referees for the 2015 Africa Cup of Nations, 2017 Africa Cup of Nations and the 2017 FIFA U-17 World Cup. He refereed the final of the 2017 Africa U-17 Cup of Nations in Gabon

External links
Hamada Nampiandraza, WorldReferee.com

Living people
1984 births
Malagasy football referees
Place of birth missing (living people)
21st-century Malagasy people